F-Stop Music is a subsidiary of Atlantic Records. Singer-songwriter and Tampa native, Matt Hires, was the first artist to sign with F-Stop. Soon after, Jonathan Tyler and the Northern Lights joined F-Stop, bringing their soul-infused rock to the label.

Artists 
 Jonathan Tyler and the Northern Lights
 Matt Hires
 Brett Dennen

References

External links 
 
 Atlantic Records Official website

American record labels
Atlantic Records